Several sports are played across Brunei, and the nation also send teams to compete in tournaments both home and abroad.

Individual Sports

Outdoor Sports
Brunei used to hold the short lived Brunei Open Golf Tournament, as part of the Asian Golf Tour and also Aberdeen Brunei Senior Masters Golf Tournament.

Combat Sports
Silat Melayu is widely practised in the nation like its neighbouring countries in the Malay Archipelago. The local martial arts in Brunei is called "Silat Suffian Bela Diri".

Team Sports

The most popular team sport in Brunei is association football. The Brunei national football team joined FIFA in 1969, but has not had much success. Brunei's top football league is the Brunei Super League, which is managed by the Football Association of Brunei Darussalam (FABD). Its first football league was the Brunei Premier League, which was held from 2002 until 2019. Rugby union, Rugby sevens and basketball are also played in Brunei. The Brunei national rugby union team is in the 6th division. Brunei had a short-lived basketball tournament – the Brunei Cup, as well as a short-lived professional basketball team named Brunei Barracudas, which featured in the ASEAN Basketball League from 2009 to 2012.

Major sport events

Brunei holds its biennial national multi-sport event – Brunei Darussalam National Games (Jawi: سوكن كبڠسأن بروني دارالسلام, abbreviated as SKBD) since 2012, involving young athletes represent the nation's four districts, government agencies and private organisations. It also participates in neighbouring Malaysia's Sukma Games since 2000 as an invitational team and international sporting events such as the BIMP-EAGA Friendship Games, the Olympic Games, the Asian Games, the Commonwealth Games and the Southeast Asian Games. Brunei has hosted the 1999 Southeast Asian Games and the 2008 and 2018 BIMP-EAGA Friendship Games.

References